Verkh-Aleyka is a rural locality (a selo) in Novoaleysky Selsoviet, Tretyakovsky District, Altai Krai, Russia. The population was 234 as of 2013. There are 4 streets.

Geography 
Verkh-Aleyka is located 57 km southeast of Staroaleyskoye (the district's administrative centre) by road. Novoaleyskoye is the nearest rural locality.

References 

Rural localities in Tretyakovsky District